Outside Looking Out is the debut album by The Late Bronze Age, a collaboration between musicians Bruce Hampton and Billy McPherson. It was recorded in the summer and fall of 1980, and was released on LP later that year by Landslide Records as the first entry in their catalogue. In 2002, the album was reissued on CD by Terminus Records.

On the album, Hampton appears as "Hampton B. Coles (Ret.)," and McPherson is listed as "Ben 'Pops' Thornton." The cover photo features Hampton made up to look like a much older man, while McPherson is seen wearing a marching band jacket. The duo are joined by a number of guest musicians, and the credits also list bogus players supposedly performing on imaginary instruments such as "oozic" and "potarth."

Reception

In a review for AllMusic, Ann Wickstrom wrote: "Though Hampton's entire body of work can be considered a bit bizarre by any standard, this one just might take the cake." She described the music as "all over the map," but acknowledged that "the highly varied instrumentation and way-beyond-peculiar lyrics" set the album apart. She concluded: "You have to love a guy who did as he pleased with the wacky clutter that was rambling around in his head."

Robert Palmer, writing for The New York Times, called the album "a refreshing antidote to both predictable radio fare and the more self-conscious experimentation of much of the current rock vanguard." He noted that "the songs are cleverly put together and amiably sung, the musicianship is first-rate, and some of the lyrics do make some sort of sense," while the musicians "never take themselves too seriously."

Hal Horowitz of Creative Loafing noted that Hampton's "atonal, throaty ranting, non-sequitur-heavy lyrics, outrageous song titles... and jolting tempo changes" are "an acquired taste," but called the album a powerful example of "Hampton's... warped genius."

Track listing

 "NCO Housing" – 2:59
 "King Greed" – 3:25
 "A Stained Soul Cringes at the Small Details in the Mirror of Embarrassment" – 3:42
 "Fat Brooms Brush the Number Bush" – 3:53
 "Farmers Earn Livings" – 4:35
 "The Late Bronze Age" – 3:05
 "Pen Pals Diminished" – 4:00
 "When in Doubt Go Completely Out... Or Do Something Familiar" – 2:00
 "Merged Moons" – 5:59
 "Rehearsals for Fainting (Been False Accused)" – 4:02
 "Seven Men in a Bazooka" – 9:02 (CD reissue bonus track)

Personnel 

 Hampton B. Coles (Ret.) (Bruce Hampton) – vocals, slide guitar, chazoid
 Ben "Pops" Thornton (Billy McPherson) – vocals, guitar, electric bass, synthesizer, keyboards, tenor saxophone, clarinet, bass clarinet, flute
 Paul McCandless – oboe
 Father Eal Sagwag – trombone, electric piano
 Tim Miller – violin
 Adan Abbott – cello, alto saxophone
 Mark Vigorito – cello, alto saxophone
 Robert Cheatham – cello, alto saxophone
 Mason – vibraphone, bass
 Yazam Parvanta – tabla
 R. Albert Nicholson – drums
 David Earle Johnson – percussion
 Tom Fatterusso – oozic
 Col. Crawford Boyd – potarth, bawa

References

1980 debut albums
Experimental rock albums by American artists